Hermacha is a genus of mygalomorphae spiders in the family Entypesidae. It was first described by Eugène Louis Simon in 1889. Originally placed with the Ctenizidae, it was transferred to the funnel-web trapdoor spiders in 1985, then to the Entypesidae in 2020.
It is a senior synonym of Damarchodes and Hermachola.

Species
 it contains 17 species, found in Africa, Colombia, and Brazil:
Hermacha anomala (Bertkau, 1880) – Brazil
Hermacha brevicauda Purcell, 1903 – South Africa
Hermacha caudata Simon, 1889 (type) – Mozambique
Hermacha conspersa Mello-Leitão, 1941 – Colombia
Hermacha evanescens Purcell, 1903 – South Africa
Hermacha fossor (Bertkau, 1880) – Brazil
Hermacha fulva Tucker, 1917 – South Africa
Hermacha itatiayae Mello-Leitão, 1923 – Brazil
Hermacha lanata Purcell, 1902 – South Africa
Hermacha maraisae Ríos-Tamayo, Engelbrecht & Goloboff, 2021 – South Africa
Hermacha mazoena Hewitt, 1915 – South Africa
Hermacha montana Ríos-Tamayo, Engelbrecht & Goloboff, 2021 – South Africa
Hermacha nigrispinosa Tucker, 1917 – South Africa
Hermacha purcelli (Simon, 1903) – South Africa
Hermacha septemtrionalis Ríos-Tamayo, Engelbrecht & Goloboff, 2021 – South Africa
Hermacha sericea Purcell, 1902 – South Africa
Hermacha tuckeri Raven, 1985 – South Africa

Formerly included:
H. bicolor (Pocock, 1897) (Transferred to Brachytheliscus)
H. capensis (Ausserer, 1871) (Transferred to Hermachola)
H. crudeni Hewitt, 1913 (Transferred to Hermachola)
H. grahami (Hewitt, 1915) (Transferred to Hermachola)
H. iricolor Mello-Leitão, 1923 (Transferred to Rachias)
H. leporina Simon, 1891 (Transferred to Stenoterommata)
H. curvipes Purcell, 1902 (Transferred to Ekapa)
H. nigra Tucker, 1917 (Transferred to Ekapa)'

Nomen dubiumH. nigromarginata'' Strand, 1907

See also
 List of Entypesidae species

References

Further reading

Mygalomorphae genera
Entypesidae
Spiders of Africa
Spiders of South America